Einar Þór Daníelsson (born 19 January 1970) is an Icelandic former footballer who played in for UMF Grindavík, KR Reykjavík, KAA Gent, FSV Zwickau, OFI Crete, Stoke City, Lillestrøm SK, ÍBV and also for the Iceland national team.

Club career
Einar played for local side KR Reykjavík before moving to Greek side OFI Crete in 1999. He joined English side Stoke City in November 1999 along with a number of fellow countrymen following the club being taken over by a group of Icelandic businessmen. Einar made a good start scoring on his debut in a 4–0 win away at Wycombe Wanderers. However unlike some of the Icelandic players Einar failed to adapt to English football and left after making just nine appearances. He went on to play for Lillestrøm SK, KR Reykjavík, ÍBV and Grótta .

International career
Einar made his debut for the Iceland national football team on 17 October 1993, coming on as a late substitute for Rúnar Kristinsson in the 1–3 defeat to Tunisia. He went on to win 21 caps for his country over the following nine years, and scored his only international goal in the 4–0 win against Liechtenstein on 20 August 1997.

Career statistics

Club
Sources:

International
Source:

References

1970 births
Living people
Einar Danielsson
Stoke City F.C. players
OFI Crete F.C. players
Lillestrøm SK players
Einar Danielsson
English Football League players
Einar Danielsson
Eliteserien players
Expatriate footballers in Norway
Expatriate footballers in England
Expatriate footballers in Greece
Einar Danielsson
Einar Danielsson
Einar Danielsson
FSV Zwickau players
Einar Danielsson
Einar Danielsson
2. Bundesliga players
Super League Greece players
Association football midfielders
Einar Danielsson
Einar Danielsson